The Lexington Colts were a baseball team competing in the Blue Grass League, 1908–1912, the Ohio State League, 1913–1916, and the Mountain States League, 1954. The 1908 Lexington team was also called the "Thoroughbreds," Neither the team nor the league lasted through the 1954 season, but the manager was former major leaguer Zeke Bonura and a star was future major leaguer Lou Johnson.

References

Defunct baseball teams in Kentucky
Defunct minor league baseball teams
Ohio State League teams
Sports in Lexington, Kentucky
Defunct Mountain States League (1948–1954) teams
Baseball teams established in 1908
Baseball teams disestablished in 1954
Blue Grass League teams
1909 establishments in Kentucky
1954 disestablishments in Kentucky